Edward Alfred Harrison (born 1869), known as E. A. Harrison, was an American architect who worked as a staff architect for the Atchison, Topeka & Santa Fe Railway, with offices in Topeka, Kansas, and later in Chicago, Illinois.

Born in Hamilton, Ontario, Harrison studied under Canadian architect James Balfour from 1887 to 1892. He became an architectural draftsman for the San Francisco & San Joaquin Valley Railway, a Santa Fe subsidiary, in 1887. He began architectural work for  the Santa Fe at Topeka, Kansas. Prior to 1901 he was a member of the United States Navy's Guam Survey Board. He became a member of the American Railway Engineering Association in 1914, and was a member of the Association's Committee VI - Buildings from 1915 to 1919, and its Committee XXIII - Shops and Locomotive Terminals in 1921.

As the System Architect for the Santa Fe, Harrison often was the approving official for work done by railroad staff members or by others working for the railroad. The railroad prepared plans for the El Navajo Hotel in Gallup, New Mexico, based on architect Mary Colter's design, but it is Harrison's signature which appears on the drawings as the approving railroad official.

Harrison retired from the Santa Fe January 1, 1940, and in 1948 was living in Dallas, Texas.

Works 
 Depot, 307 South Grant, Amarillo, Texas, 1910, Spanish Mission Revival style
 Station, Lexington Junction, Missouri, 1912
 Station, Fowler, Kansas, 1912
 Freight Depot and Office Building, Topeka, Kansas, 1913
 Passenger Station and Office Building, Galveston, Texas, 1913
 Remodeling and additions to Eating Houses at Dodge City, Kansas, and Fort Worth, Texas, 1913
 Telegraph stations at Las Vegas, New Mexico, and Trinidad, Colorado, 1913
 Freight Depot and Office Building, Dodge City, Kansas, 1913
 Dormitory, Bright Angel Camp, Grand Canyon, Arizona, 1914
 Fireproof Records Building, Topeka, Kansas, 1915
 Combination Depot, Shattuck, Oklahoma, 1917
 Depot, 416 E 5th Street, Eureka, Kansas, 1917, Prairie style, NRHP 12001119
 Depot, 555 East Pikes Peak Avenue, Colorado Springs, Colorado, 1917, Jacobethan style, NRHP 79000597
 Powerhouse, Shopton, Iowa, 1918
 Sheet Metal House, Albuquerque, New Mexico, 1918
 AT&SF Fire Station, First/Second SW, Albuquerque, New Mexico, 1920, Rustic Southwest style
 Machine Shop, Albuquerque, New Mexico, 1921
 Water Treatment Plant, La Junta, Colorado, 1922
 Boiler Shop, Albuquerque, New Mexico, 1923
 El Navajo Hotel, Gallup, New Mexico, 1923, Pueblo Revival style, Mary Colter design, demolished 1957
 Tender Repair Shop (tank shop), Albuquerque, New Mexico, 1925
 Depot, Panhandle, Texas, 1927
 Lavatory and Ice Storage Building, La Junta, Colorado, 1929
 Santa Fe Building, 900 South Polk Street, Amarillo, Texas, 1930, Late Gothic Revival style, NRHP 96000939
 Santa Fe Building, Galveston, Texas, 1932, Art Deco style
 Depot, Oklahoma City, Oklahoma, 1934, NRHP

Gallery

References

20th-century American architects
American railway architects
Atchison, Topeka and Santa Fe Railway people